Soft Landing is a 1982 sculpture by Kenneth Snelson, installed at Denver's 17th Street Plaza (1225 17th Street), in the U.S. state of Colorado.

References

1982 sculptures
Outdoor sculptures in Denver